Tomohiro Shimamura (born 13 February 1984) is a Japanese sabre fencer. He competed in the 2020 Summer Olympics.

References

1984 births
Living people
Sportspeople from Tokyo
Fencers at the 2020 Summer Olympics
Japanese male sabre fencers
Olympic fencers of Japan
Asian Games competitors for Japan
Fencers at the 2014 Asian Games
Fencers at the 2018 Asian Games